Cesar, César or Cèsar may refer to:

Arts, entertainment, and media 
 César (film), a 1936 film directed by Marcel Pagnol
 César (play), a play by Marcel Pagnolt
 César Award, a French film award

Places 
 Cesar, Portugal
 Cesar River, a river within the Magdalena Basin of Colombia
 Cesar River, Chile
 Cesar Department, Colombia

Other uses 
 César (grape), an ancient red wine grape from northern Burgundy
 French ship César (1768), ship of the line, destroyed 1782
 Recife Center for Advanced Studies and Systems (C.E.S.A.R), in Brazil
 Cesar, a brand of dog food manufactured by Mars, Incorporated

People with the given name
 César (footballer, born May 1979), César Vinicio Cervo de Luca, Brazilian football centre-back
 César (footballer, born July 1979), Clederson César de Souza, Brazilian football winger
 César Alierta (born 1945), Spanish businessman
 César Augusto Soares dos Reis Ribela (born 1995), Brazilian footballer
 César Azpilicueta (born 1989), Spanish footballer
 César Baena (born 1961), Venezuelan footballer
 César Baldaccini (1921–1998), French sculptor
 César Batiz, Venezuelan investigative journalist
 César Blackman (born 1998), Panamanian footballer
 César Cedeño (born 1951), Dominican baseball player
 Cesar Chavez (1927–1993), American farm worker, labor leader and civil rights activist
 César Córdoba (born 1980), Spanish kickboxer
 César Costa (born 1941), Mexican singer and actor
 César Cui (1835–1918), Russian composer and army officer
 César Delgado (born 1981), Argentine footballer
 César Domboy (born 1990), French actor
 César Duarte Jáquez (born 1963), Mexican politician
 César Évora (born 1959), Cuban actor
 César Franck (1822–1890), Belgian classical organist and composer
 César Gaviria (born 1947), Colombian politician
 César González (disambiguation), several people
 César Hernández (disambiguation), several people
 César Huerta (born 2000), Mexican footballer
 César Keiser (1925–2007), Swiss artist
 César Manrique (1919–1992), Spanish artist, architect and activist
 César Martínez (disambiguation), several people
 César Mendoza (1918–1996), Chilean general
 César Luis Menotti (born 1938), Argentine footballer and manager
 Cesar Millan (born 1969), Mexican-American dog trainer
 César Milstein (1927–2002), Argentinian biochemist
 César Montes (born 1997), Mexican footballer
 César Mora (born 1961), Colombian musician
 César Pellegrín (born 1979), Uruguayan footballer
 César Pelli (1926–2019), Argentine architect
 César Prates (born 1975), Brazilian footballer
 Cesar Ramirez (disambiguation), several people
 César Ritz (1850–1918), Swiss hotelier
 César Rodriguez (disambiguation), several people
 Cesar Romero (disambiguation)
 Cesar Ruiz (disambiguation), multiple people
 Cesar Santos (born 1982), Cuban-American artist and portrait painter
 César Santos (born 1969), Brazilian footballer  
 César Salinas (1961–2020), Bolivian football administrator
 César Sampaio (born 1968), Brazilian footballer
 César Sánchez (born 1971), Spanish footballer
 César Sánchez (swimmer) (born 1962), Mexican swimmer
 César Soto (born 1971), Mexican boxer
 César Vallejo (1892–1938), Peruvian writer
 Cesar Virata (born 1930), Filipino politician and businessman

People with the surname
 Boštjan Cesar (born 1982), Slovenian footballer
 Bruno César (born 1988), Brazilian footballer
 Carlos César (born 1952), Portuguese politician
 Jules César (disambiguation), several people
 Julio Cesar (disambiguation), several people
 Yuri César (born 2000), Brazilian footballer

See also 
 

Portuguese masculine given names
Spanish masculine given names
French masculine given names